Good News is the debut studio album by American rapper Megan Thee Stallion. It was released on November 20, 2020, by 300 Entertainment and 1501 Certified. The album features guest appearances from DaBaby, City Girls, Lil Durk, SZA, Popcaan, Mustard, Big Sean, 2 Chainz, Young Thug, and  Beyoncé. The music was written and produced with a host of musicians, including D.A Got That Dope, LilJuMadeDaBeat, Juicy J, J. White Did It, and Scott Storch.

Good News was met with widespread acclaim, with critics praising the clever and compelling qualities of Megan Thee Stallion's raps. The album produced four singles: "Girls in the Hood", released on June 26, 2020, "Don't Stop", featuring Young Thug, released on October 2, 2020, "Body", released alongside the album, and Cry Baby, featuring DaBaby, released on February 3, 2021. The album also contains the remix of the single "Savage" from Suga, featuring Beyoncé, which earned Megan her first number one on the US Billboard Hot 100.

Commercially, Good News debuted at number two on the Billboard 200 after moving over 100,000 album-equivalent units in its first week. In addition to topping both the Top R&B/Hip-Hop Albums and Rap Albums charts, it also peaked in the top 50 of countries such as the United Kingdom, Australia, Canada, Ireland and New Zealand.

Background
Megan Pete, known professionally as Megan Thee Stallion, began writing hip hop music as a student at Texas Southern University in Houston. After gaining ideos of her freestyle rapping went viral, Megan released a mixtape titled Tina Snow in 2018. The critical and commercial success of Tina Snow caught the attention of 300 Entertainment, with whom Megan signed in November 2018. She became the first female rap artist to sign with 300 since the label's establishment in 2012. The song "Big Ole Freak" from Tina Snow became Megan Thee Stallion's first Billboard Hot 100 chart entry, and also appeared at number nine on the Billboard R&B/Hip-Hop Airplay chart, and number 38 on the Hot R&B/Hip-Hop Songs charts. She followed up with the mixtape Fever, released on May 17, 2019, via 300 Entertainment and 1501 Certified. Fever debuted at number 10 on the Billboard 200.

In October 2019, the rapper first discussed plans about dropping her debut studio album in 2020 while promoting her upcoming project Suga. She further stated that she was "ready to settle down with an album". Megan had first intended for her Suga to be her debut album, but following legal troubles between her and her label, 1501 Certified, it was instead released as an extended play (EP) on March 6, 2020.

Seven months later, in October 2020, she provided more insight into the album-making process, including posting pictures with frequent producer LilJuMadeDaBeat, and also first acknowledging that her album was under production, tweeting on October 17, 2020, "My album abt to go crazy". At that time, she was awaiting two more features to finalize the recording process. She also stated that she used the time during quarantine to write and record for her album. About the recording process, she said: "When I'm by myself, that's when my creativity comes to me. The whole album was basically written in the living room, the shower, the backyard–just visualise it with me." She officially announced the album through social media on November 12, followed by the reveal of its tracklist on November 17.

Music and lyrics 
On Good News, Megan Thee Stallion raps about the controversy surrounding herself and Tory Lanez, partying, sex, her personal life, and men she prefers not to date. One critic noted that despite being filled with "sex positivity and club-ready anthems", the album also contains "glimpses of that [serious] tone was first introduced with 'Shots Fired'". "Shots Fired", the opening track, is built around a sample of the 1995 song "Who Shot Ya?" by The Notorious B.I.G. and has been described as a "traditional", "strong" and "scathing" indirect diss track with a "ringing, stark beat" aimed at fellow rapper Tory Lanez in response to his album Daystar, which itself was released in response to allegations that Lanez shot Megan in July 2020.

The second track, "Circles", was described as "one of [Megan's] signature bad b*tch anthems", and sees her rapping over a sample of Jazmine Sullivan's 2010 single "Holding You Down (Goin' in Circles)", with lyrics that exhibit Megan's resiliency. "Cry Baby" featuring DaBaby has been described as a "slow, tick-tock-ing" song with a "haunting backing track", revolving around Megan and DaBaby's active sex lives. "Sugar Baby" was described as "bluesy [and] brassy"; a track that sees Megan "transcend sweetness" with lyrics that see her "imploring her cheapskate lover to save his money for the future".

"Freaky Girls" featuring SZA was a highly anticipated collaboration. It contains a sample of Adina Howard's 1995 debut single "Freak Like Me" and was described as "immaculate" and "a true highlight" that is "audibly rooted in 90s G-funk" with "catchy and sex-positive" lyrics. "Body", the third single from the album, was described as a "crisp three minutes of bouncy beats and self-confident lyrics", seeing Megan "celebrating body positivity". "What's New" was described as a "quintessential Megan record where she thrashes her haters for talking reckless about her", while "Work That" was called "a fun, club-friendly track" that samples rapper Juvenile's 2006 single "Rodeo" and saw Megan "continue to boast about her sexual prowess". "Intercourse" featuring Popcaan and Mustard was described as "island-tinged" and "syrupy" with "Megan [...] thriving on the dancehall sound" of the track, and "Go Crazy" featuring Big Sean and 2 Chainz was called "lithe" and sees Megan "standing tall when sparring with Big Sean and 2 Chainz [...] with two punchy verses". "Go Crazy" samples The Jackson 5’s "ABC" as well as Naughty By Nature’s "O.P.P.".

"Don't Rock Me to Sleep" features Megan singing about "moving on from a relationship" while "taking a shot at pop success". "Outside" was described as a "fun, celebratory record" and a "sing-song tune in a nice contrast from [Megan's] harder-hitting tracks" that was backed by an "electronic piano motif" sampled from "Something in My Heart" from the 1989 eponymous album by R&B singer Michel'le. "Savage Remix", which features Beyoncé, goes through "minuscule instrumental changes" from the original, with the remix being called "essentially an entirely new song, with the exception of the chorus which has remained the same", lyrically. Beyoncé's verse was noted to include subtle references to women's empowerment. "Girls in the Hood" samples "Boyz-n-the-Hood" by Eazy-E and has been described as a "minimal 80s gangsta rap". The album closes with "Don't Stop" featuring fellow rapper Young Thug, which is a hip hop track with a "punchy electronic beat", with sex-positive lyrics.

Singles
"Girls in the Hood", the first single from the album, was announced on June 24, 2020, and released two days later. The song received a lyric video and features a prominent sample of "Boyz-n-the-Hood" by Eazy-E. The single debuted and peaked at number 28 on the Hot 100. Megan performed "Girls in the Hood" live during her debut live performance at the 20th BET Awards, in a medley with the "Savage Remix", and again during her first virtual live appearance, streamed live on Tidal on August 29, 2020.

"Don't Stop" featuring Young Thug, was released along with a music video directed by Colin Tilley on October 2, 2020, as the second single from the album. It charted at number 61 on the Billboard Global 200. Megan performed the track with Young Thug during her Saturday Night Live debut on the season premiere of the 46th season of the show.

"Body" was released as the third single alongside a music video directed by Colin Tilley on November 20, 2020, coinciding with the release of the album. It was written while Megan was in quarantine and is inspired by her figure, and its music video features cameos from various celebrities, including Taraji P. Henson, Blac Chyna, and Jordyn Woods, among others.

The third track on the album "Cry Baby" featuring DaBaby was serviced to rhythmic and urban contemporary radio on February 3, 2021, as the album's fourth single. The song's official music video also premiered the same day and features a cameo from Instagram comedian BlameItonKway. The single reached number 28 on the Billboard Hot 100.

Other songs
"Savage (Remix)" featuring Beyoncé, was released on April 29, 2020. Commercially, the single has accumulated over 3 million units in the US. It became Megan's first number one on the US Billboard Hot 100.
 A music video for the song "Movie" featuring Lil Durk premiered on April 15, 2021.

Critical reception

Good News was met with widespread critical acclaim. At Metacritic, which assigns a normalized rating out of 100 to reviews from professional publications, the album has an average score of 85 based on 14 reviews.

Mikael Wood of Los Angeles Times deemed Good News the most impressive debut album of 2020 and described the rapper's voice as one of "the most authoritative voices in hip-hop," which ultimately "gives her music a rock-solid center that suits her fixed subject matter." Alexis Petridis of The Guardian noted that the album highlighted that Megan is "phenomenal at what she does," and further described her talents as "a moveable feast". Robin Murray of Clash wrote that "Good News is the sound of Megan Thee Stallion pushing against the boundaries and an album overwhelming in its creative intensity". Apart from hailing it a "late contender of the Album of the Year", Murray stated that "the album emphasises the riveting nature of her self-expression, and her canny ear as a cultural curator". At Evening Standard, David Smyth attributed the album as "money, sex, single entendres, graphic imagery and a bulletproof self-confidence", adding that Megan has "amassed tonnes of both, and shared every vivid detail of the process in her sparse, old school songs". A. D. Amorosi of Variety wrote that the album is "focused on fun while still being a proud statement on Black womanhood" and concluded that it finds Megan "moving confidently to the next level", though the writer noted "Outside" and other "uncluttered" tracks to be "more warm-blooded than most of Good News, one wishes there was more of that sound on her debut album."

In a review for AllMusic, Fred Thomas claimed that "Rather than coast on her established success, Good News finds the rapper firing off at full power, decimating her haters, and delivering track after track of sex-positive, voraciously vulgar, yet stunningly clever rhyme skills." Candice McDuffie's compliments also focused on similar elements in the review for Consequence of Sound; "Good News showcases Megan the Stallion’s creative depth, her euphonious inventiveness, and libidinous wordplay. She completely demolishes any track she appears on." Keith Harris at NME gave similar praise, stating "Megan's own flow is musical enough to offer its own hooks without outside ornamentation."

Accolades

Track listing

Sample credits
”Shots Fired” contains a sample of "Who Shot Ya?" by The Notorious B.I.G.
  "Circles" contains samples of "Holding You Down (Goin' in Circles)", performed by Jazmine Sullivan, which further samples Doug E. Fresh and MC Ricky D's "La Di Da Di", Mary J. Blige's "Be Happy" and Nas's "I Can" and "Affirmative Action".
  "Freaky Girls" contains a sample of "Freak Like Me" by Adina Howard.
  "Work That" contains samples of "Rodeo", performed by Juvenile, which further samples R. Kelly's "Bump n' Grind (Old School Remix)".
"Go Crazy" samples "O.P.P." by Naughty By Nature, which in turn samples "ABC" by The Jackson 5.
 "Outside" samples "Something in My Heart" by Michel'le.
 "Girls in the Hood" samples "Boyz-n-the-Hood" by Eazy-E.
 “Savage Remix” writers who contributed to the remix version and were absent from the writing process in the original version

Credits and personnel
Credits adapted from Tidal.

Performance

 Megan Thee Stallion – primary artist 
 DaBaby – featured artist 
 City Girls – featured artist 
 Hot Girl Meg – featured artist 
 Lil Durk – featured artist 
 SZA – featured artist 
 Mustard – featured artist 
 Popcaan – featured artist 
 2 Chainz – featured artist 
 Big Sean – featured artist 
 Beyoncé – featured artist 
 Young Thug – featured artist

Musicians

 Cody Tarpley – bass , drums , keyboards 
 Vincent Van Den Ende – bass , drums , keyboards

Production

 Buddah Bless – production 
 Cool & Dre – production 
 Neky Freq – production 
 D.A. Doman – production 
 Lil Ju – production 
 Helluva (producer) – production 
 Tay Keith – production 
 Juicy J – production 
 Avendon – production 
 Cody Tarpley – production 
 Z3N – production 
 Mustard – production 
 J. R. Rotem – production 
 J. White Did It – production 
 Illdaproducer – production 
 Scott Storch – production 
 Suntman – additional production 
 Rickstarr Didit – co-production 
 Gyltryp – co-production 
 Benjamin Lasneier – co-production 
 Pooyandeh – co-production 
 Vynk – co-production

Technical

 Mike Dean – mastering , mixing 
 Colin Leonard – mastering 
 MixedByAli – mixing 
 Jaycen Joshua – mixing 
 KY – mixing 
 Stuart Price – mixing , recording 
 Ricky Reed – vocal mixing 
 Sage Skolfield – mixing assistance 
 Sean Solymar – mixing assistance 
 Jacob Richards – mixing assistance 
 Mike Seaberg – mixing assistance 
 Source – recording , engineering 
 Coach Brodie – recording 
 Joshua Samuel – recording 
 Rob Bisel – recording 
 Nolan Presley – recording 
 eMix – recording 
 Bainz – engineering , vocal recording engineering 
 Aresh Banaji ― engineering assistance 

Notes
 "Recording" and "Recording engineering" are grouped together as "Recording".

Charts

Weekly charts

Year-end charts

Certifications

References

2020 debut albums
Megan Thee Stallion albums
Albums produced by Cool & Dre
Albums produced by Scott Storch
Albums produced by J. R. Rotem
Albums produced by Juicy J